Alucita sakhalinica is a moth of the family Alucitidae. It is found in Sakhalin, Russia.

References

Moths described in 1995
Alucitidae
Moths of Asia
Taxa named by Aleksei Konstantinovich Zagulyaev